The 1895–96 season was Newton Heath's fourth season in the Football League and their second in the Second Division. They finished sixth in the league, which was not enough to earn a chance for promotion back to the First Division. In the FA Cup, the Heathens were knocked out in the Second Round, losing 5–1 in a replay against Derby County after vanquishing Kettering Town in the First Round.

The club also entered teams in the Lancashire and Manchester Senior Cups in 1895–96. They were knocked out of the Lancashire Cup in the first round, losing 2–1 at home to Bury. In the Manchester Cup, they received a bye to the third round, but were immediately knocked out by Fairfield, losing 5–2.

Football League Second Division

FA Cup

References

Manchester United F.C. seasons
Newton Heath F.C.